Sirkeli Höyük is one of the largest tells (settlement mounds) of Cilicia with an area of approximately 80 ha. It is 40 kilometers east of the city of Adana, northwest of the village Sirkeli in the district of Ceyhan, at the breakthrough of the Ceyhan through the Misis Mountains (Turkish: Nur Dağ).

References

 Mirko Novák, Ekin Kozal und Deniz Yaşin Meier (Hg.): Sirkeli Höyük. Ein urbanes Zentrum am Puruna-Pyramos im Ebenen Kilikien. Schriften zur Vorderasiatischen Archäologie 13. Harrassowitz, Wiesbaden 2019. ISBN 978-3-447-11161-4.

 Alexander Ahrens: John Garstang at Sirkeli Höyük, Cilician Plain, in 1936–1937: Old Photographs and New Evidence from the Renewed Excavations. In: Anatolica (Annuaire international pour les civilisations de l'Asie antérieure) 40 (2014), S. 47–60. [DOI: 10.2143/ANA.40.0.3036674]

 Alexander Ahrens, Ekin Kozal, Mirko Novák: Sirkeli Höyük in Smooth Cilicia. A General Overview from the 4th to the 1st Millennium BC. In: Paolo Matthiae u. a. (Hrsg.): Proceedings of the 6th International Congress of the Archaeology of the Ancient Near East, 5 May – 10 May 2008, "Sapienza", Università di Roma (6ICAANE); Vol. 2: Excavations, Surveys and Restorations, Reports on Recent Field Archaeology in the Near East (Wiesbaden 2010), S. 55–74.

 M. Forlanini: How to infer Ancient Roads and Intineraries from heterogenous Hittite Texts: The Case of the Cilician (Kizzuwatnean) Road System, KASKAL 10, 2013, S. 1–34.

 Ekin Kozal und Mirko Novák: Sirkeli Höyük. A Bronze and Iron Age Urban Settlement in Plain Cilicia. In: Ü. Yalçın (Hg.): Anatolian Metals VI, Der Anschnitt Beiheft 25 (Bochum 2013), S. 229–238. ISSN 0003-5238.

 Ekin Kozal und Mirko Novák: Facing Muwattalli: Some Thoughts on the Visibility and Function of the Rock Reliefs at Sirkeli Höyük, Cilicia. In: E. Kozal, M. Akar, Y. Heffron, Ç. Çilingiroğlu, T.E. Şerifoğlu, C. Çakırlar, S. Ünlüsoy und E. Jean (Hg.): Questions, Approaches, and Dialogues in the Eastern Mediterranean Archaeology Studies in Honor of Marie-Henriette and Charles Gates, Alter Orient und Altes Testament 445 (Münster 2017), S. 371–388. ISBN 978-3-86835-251-1.

 Barthel Hrouda: Vorläufiger Bericht über die Ausgrabungsergebnisse auf dem Sirkeli Höyük/Südtürkei von 1992–1996. In: Istanbuler Mitteilungen 47 (1997), S. 91–150.

 Horst Ehringhaus: Vorläufiger Bericht über die Ausgrabung auf dem Sirkeli Höyük, Provinz Adana/Türkei im Jahre 1997. In: Istanbuler Mitteilungen 49 (1999), S. 83–140.

 Horst Ehringhaus: Götter, Herrscher, Inschriften – Die Felsreliefs der hethitischen Großreichszeit in der Türkei. von Zabern 2005, ISBN 3-8053-3469-9, S. 95–101.

 Mirko Novák, Susanne Rutishauser: Kizzuwatna: Archaeology. In: M. Weeden und L.Z. Ullmann (Hg.): Hittite Landscape and Geography. Handbuch der Orientalistik I,125 (Leiden 2017), S. 134–145. ISBN 978-90-04-34174-6.

 Alexander Sollee, Susanne Rutishauser, Christian Hübner, Birthe Hemeier und Mirko Novák: Die Wiederentdeckung des antiken Kummanni/Kisuatni: Fernerkundung, geophysikalische Prospektion und archäologische Ausgrabungen am Sirkeli Höyük, Türkei. In: Mitteilungen der Naturforschenden Gesellschaft in Bern 2018, S. 102–125.

Ceyhan
Cilicia
Archaeological sites in the Mediterranean Region, Turkey
Geography of Adana Province
Rock reliefs in Turkey
Tells (archaeology)